Ricardo George (born 3 December 1997) is a Liberian professional footballer who plays as a midfielder or left back for English football club Peckham Town who also had a games with the Liberia national football team.

Club career 
Born in Monrovia, Ricardo George moved to the United States at an early age and began his youth career with Ironbound SC and later with Cedar Stars Academy. He also played collegiately at Eastern Florida State College, where he received various accolades.

During the 2017 and 2018 seasons George played with USL League Two club Lehigh Valley United. He made 12 appearances for the club and scored 1 goal. His play with Lehigh Valley attracted the attention of USL Championship side Bethlehem Steel F.C. and was invited to pre-season training.

In 2019 he signed with National Independent Soccer Association club Atlanta SC. On 14 September 2019, he made his first appearance for the club in a 3–1 loss to Stumptown Athletic. He ended the season appearing in four matches playing as a left-back.

After leaving Atlanta he signed with USL League Two side Des Moines Menace. On 21 March 2021, George signed with Morris Elite SC in the USL League Two to play in the club's inaugural season. After that on March 11, 2022, George Signed with Albion San Diego in the National Independent Soccer Association to play in the club's inaugural season.

International career
In April 2021, George received his first call to the Liberia national football team. On 28 April 2021 he made his debut for Liberia, appearing as a starter in a 2–0 victory over Sierra Leone in the Manu River Union Football for Peace Tournament.

References

External links 
 Des Moines Menace

1997 births
Living people
Liberian footballers
Liberia international footballers
Association football midfielders
EFSC Titans men's soccer players
Lehigh Valley United players
Morris Elite SC players
USL League Two players
Sportspeople from Monrovia